The Mount Kinabalu International Climbathon is an international skyrunning competition held for the first time in 1987 (went international in 1988). It runs every year on Mount Kinabalu (Malaysia) in October, race valid for the Skyrunner World Series till 2010.

Winners

See also 
 Skyrunner World Series

References

External links 

 Official web site

Skyrunning competitions
Skyrunner World Series
Athletics competitions in Malaysia
Mount Kinabalu